Tazkirul Quran  is an Urdu translation and commentary on the Qur'an, written by Maulana Wahiduddin Khan, in 1985. First published in Arabic in 2008 from Cairo as al-Tadhkir al-Qawim fi Tafsir al-Quran al-Hakim, the work has also been translated into Hindi and English. The English version was published by Goodword Books in 2011 as The Quran Translation and Commentary with Parallel Arabic Text.

Background
Maulana Wahiduddin Khan, born in 1925  at Azamgarh in India, was an Islamic spiritual scholar who was well versed in both classical Islamic learning and modern science. Maulana Wahiduddin Khan's English translation of the Quran is widely acknowledged as simple, clear and easy-to-read.

Themes
According to the Maulana, the holy Qur'an, the central religious text of Islam, which Muslims believe to be a revelation from God (Allah).,  stresses the importance of man's discovery of truth at the level of realization. Its objective is to explain  God's   Creation plan, i.e. why God created this world; the purpose  of settling man on earth, what is required from man in his pre-death life span, and how his life's  record will  determine  what the post-death period  will  bring reward or punishment.  The Qur'an thus serves to guide man on his entire journey through life into the after-life. The main themes of the Qur'an, clearly  set  forth  in  the present translation and commentary of the Qur'an, are enlightenment, peace and closeness to God. To enable the  reader to discover God at a purely intellectual level, the Qur'an emphasizes tawassum, tadabbur, and tafakkur - reflection, thinking and contemplation on the signs of God throughout the world.

See also
Maulana Wahiduddin Khan
Saniyasnain Khan

References

Sunni tafsir
Indian religious texts
20th-century Indian books
21st-century Indian books
Indian non-fiction books
Urdu-language books
Urdu-language non-fiction literature
Sufi tafsir